Dame Noeline Taurua  (born 26 March 1968) is a New Zealand international netball coach and former representative player. She is currently head coach of the New Zealand national netball team, the Silver Ferns.

Early life
Taurua was born in Papakura to Kingi and Polly Taurua,  her fathers tribe was Ngāpuhi and Ngāti Whātua on her mothers side. Taurua is the youngest of five children.  Taurua expressed an interest in Athletics in her schooling years.

Playing career
Taurua was a member of the Silver Ferns from 1993–99. During that time she won a silver medal at the 1998 Commonwealth Games in Kuala Lumpur and a bronze medal at the 1995 Netball World Championships in Birmingham. A knee injury in 1999 ended her playing career, having played in 34 test matches for the Silver Ferns.

Coaching career
In 2011, Taurua acted as unofficial assistant coach to the Silver Ferns alongside Ruth Aitken The follow year she accepted an official position as Silver Ferns assistant coach after being offered the role several times. In domestic netball, Taurua coached the Waikato Bay of Plenty Magic from 2002–13, leading them to two National Bank Cup titles (2005, 2006) and one ANZ Championship title (2012).

In 2013, Taurua decided to finish her coaching duties for the Silver Ferns after performing in the role for 1.5 seasons for family reasons  She also stepped down as head coach of the Magic after spending 11 years at the franchise. Her replacement at the Magic was former New South Wales Swifts coach Julie Fitzgerald. Taurua later accepted a role as head coach for Southern Steel in their final 2016 ANZ Championship season.

After the dissolution of the ANZ Championship in 2016, the Sunshine Coast Lightning announced the signing of Taurua heading into the 2017 season of the Suncorp Super Netball league in Australia. Taurua coached the Lightning to back-to-back premierships in the new competition, before being selected as the head coach of the New Zealand national netball team in August 2018. During her time as Silver Ferns head coach, New Zealand won the 2018 Fast5 Netball World Series and 2019 Netball World Cup. As well as being the national team coach, Taurua continued to coach the Lightning in Australia. On 20 August 2019, Taurua announced her departure from the Lightning after her third year coaching the team. She departed the Lightning having coached them to two consecutive premierships (2017, 2018) and one minor premiership (2019).

Taurua was not shortlisted for the role of headcoach in 2015  however after the resignation of 
Janine Southby from a failed Commonwealth Games campaign accepted the job as the Silver Ferns 11th coach 

In 2019 Taurua coached the Silver Ferns to a  52-51 win over the Australian Diamonds in the Netball World Cup in Liverpool a competition the team hadn't won since 2003.  Successful again in her career Taurua coached the team to win the 2021 Constellation Cup ending a nine year drought.

Netball New Zealand were delighted once again when Taurua confirmed she would be coaching the Silver Ferns until 2023.
Taurua coached the Silver Ferns to win a Bronze medal at the 2022 Commonwealth Games in Birmingham.  

Taurua is known for her strict fitness criteria for any Silver Fern trialists and players.

Awards and Honors 
 2018: Queensland Sport Coach of the Year
 2018: Tai Tokerau Māori Sports Awards – Coach of the Year
 2019: Matariki Awards – Te Waitā Award for Sport
2020:  Halberg Award Coach of the year 

In the 2020 New Year Honours, Taurua was appointed a Dame Companion of the New Zealand Order of Merit, for services to netball.

Taurua was appointed to the High Performance Sport New Zealand board in September 2022, this was to work alongside athletic gold medalist Valerie Adams,  Black Sox coach Don Tricker and Paralympic swimmer Duane Kale.

Personal Life 

Taurua is a mother of five children and married to Edward Goldsmith.

References

External links 
 Silver Ferns profile: Noeline Taurua

1968 births
Living people
New Zealand Māori netball players
New Zealand netball players
New Zealand international netball players
New Zealand netball coaches
Netball players at the 1998 Commonwealth Games
Commonwealth Games silver medallists for New Zealand
Commonwealth Games medallists in netball
Dames Companion of the New Zealand Order of Merit
New Zealand national netball team coaches
Capital Shakers players
Suncorp Super Netball coaches
ANZ Championship coaches
Sporting dames
Southern Steel coaches
Waikato Bay of Plenty Magic coaches
Netball players from Auckland
1995 World Netball Championships players
National Bank Cup coaches
Medallists at the 1998 Commonwealth Games